Spin the Music is the ninth studio album by the Japanese singer Crystal Kay. It was released in Japan on December 8, 2010, and was her first studio album since Color Change! in 2008.

Two singles were taken from Spin the Music, "After Love (First Boyfriend)/Girlfriend" in 2009, and "Journey (Kimi to Futari de)" fifteen months later. The song "Time of Love" was used as the opening theme to the NHK drama Jūnen Saki mo Kimi ni Koishite, but did not receive an official single release. Two songs on the album were taken from the Flash EP, the title track and "I Pray".

Track listing

Charts 
The album entered the Oricon Weekly Chart at number 42 after peaking at number 28 on the Daily Chart, and sold 4,439 that week.

References 

2010 albums
Crystal Kay albums
Japanese-language albums
Epic Records albums